Simon's Cat is a British animated web cartoon and book series written by Simon Tofield. It features a hungry cat who uses various tactics to get his owner to feed him.

In January 2009, it was announced that Simon's Cat would be published in book format in response to the success of the first animated films. Canongate Books released the title on October 1st, 2009 in the United Kingdom. It was later released in 26 other countries with 9 titles added to the series.

In June 2012, Walt Disney Animation Studios began releasing specially-made shorts of Simon's Cat, while a Simon's Cat newspaper strip ran in the Daily Mirror from 2011 to 2013. In August 2015, it was announced that Endemol Shine UK had acquired a stake in Simon's Cat.

In May 2016, Simon's Cat partnered with the American preschool programme Sesame Street as part of their Love to Learn campaign.

In June 2017, the game Simon's Cat: Crunch Time premiered.

In February 2018, the game Simon's Cat Dash premiered.

Background
Tofield, who has over 13 years of experience with animating commercials for companies such as Marmite and Tesco, initially came up with the idea of his first short film as a way of teaching himself how to animate using Adobe Flash. He also further revealed that inspiration for the series came from experiences with his four cats – Teddy, Hugh, Jess, and Maisie, with Hugh being the primary inspiration.

Production
The series is animated with Adobe Flash Professional (now Adobe Animate) and TVPaint. The pictures are hand-drawn electronically, using an A4-size Wacom Intuos 3 graphics tablet.

Characters
 Simon's Cat: The main character; an affectionate but often stubborn and clumsy cat. His antics include his quest for food (his signature gesture is to point at his mouth or dish when hungry), and other ways of vexing his "owner", Simon. Simon's Cat loves cat food, but also enjoys birds, mice, and fish out of Simon's koi pond. A significant amount of the humour in the book comes from his efforts to capture birds, mice, and fish. Simon's Cat has not been officially named, although writer Simon Tofield says that Simon's Cat is based on his own cat, Hugh (in the show, Simon has been hinted to call his cat Gilbert).
 Simon Tofield: The long-suffering "owner" of the cat, a graphic artist. Simon is good-natured, gentle, easily startled, and accident-prone. As shown in "Spider Cat" and "Scary Legs," he is very arachnophobic. Simon is from Leighton Buzzard, Bedfordshire.
 Kitten: The playful sidekick of Simon's Cat, who was brought home by Simon in October 2011. In spite of his tender age, he appears to be considerably smarter and more cunning than his adult counterpart. Kitten, too, will point at his mouth or dish when hungry, just like his adult counterpart.
 Simon's Sister's Dog: A dog that first appears in the video "Fed Up," in which he is fed underneath the table by a family. The dog also appears in the book and loves to play fetch. It's revealed that his name is Oscar.
 The Bird: A bird who Simon's Cat chases, and who generally outsmarts him. Also features as a cat toy or even a Christmas ornament.
 The Hedgehog: A hedgehog that lives in Simon's back garden. Simon's Cat loves to annoy the hedgehog by impaling objects such as apples, leaves, and tennis balls onto its prickles. The hedgehog also has children.
 The Bunny: A rabbit that lives in Simon's garden who can literally run circles around Cat.
 The Squirrel: The squirrel lives in a tree in Simon's back yard. He loves to pelt Simon's Cat with acorns when the cat chases him.
 The Garden Gnome: A garden gnome similar to the one broken by Simon's Cat in "Let Me In." The gnome is seen holding either a fishing rod or a net. Simon's Cat often tries to get the gnome to help in his schemes to catch food. Cat considers the gnome a friend, apparently unaware that it is an inanimate object.
 The Toad: The toad also lives in the garden.
 The Frog: The frog appears in some shorts as well, and is differentiated from the toad in a "How to Draw... Frogs and Toads" short as well as in the "Simon Draws" section of the Kitten Chaos book.
 Chloe: A female cat who is the love interest of Simon's Cat. Demure and somewhat snobbish, she exhibits a finicky appetite, munching on a trail of cat treats or even butterflies, but angrily refusing a mouse offered by Simon's Cat.
 The Mouse: Another creature that is often chased by Simon's Cat. Despite their adversarial relationship, the mouse aided Simon's Cat in an elaborate plot intended to impress a female cat in one short, later helping him to get food in another."
 Maisy: Another female cat who falls in love with Simon's Cat, even though he grows to be terrified of her.
 The Crow: A bird who sometimes annoys Simon's Cat.
 Jazz: A grumpy territorial Persian that Simon's Cat often gets into fights with.
 Teddy: A stray cat living in a box that Simon's Cat befriends. As of late 2022, he appears to have found a forever home.

Episodes

Main series
This is a comprehensive list of all the Black & White (rarely in colour) episodes of Simon's Cat including holiday specials. There are over 100 episodes of Simon's Cat, ranging from episodes published in 2008 all the way to 2022.

Off to the Vet and Color Episodes
In the summer of 2015, a crowdfunding campaign was launched to raise funds to allow Simon and his team to make a 13-minute colour episode of Simon's Cat. Everybody who contributed at least £5 was offered free access to the clip and other perks. The campaign was successful and the clip was released to supporters in August 2015. In January 2017, the clip went on sale (unlike the other episodes, Off to the Vet previously was not offered for free viewing). It was released for free viewing on 26 October 2017. It was then re-released in black & white on 26 April 2018 at the request of fans who were curious to see what the film would be like in the series' signature black & white style.

Simon's Cat Logic
A series of animated cartoons with embedded live footage that explains cats' traits and behaviour and what can be done to keep them happy and healthy. It is introduced and narrated by Simon Tofield (animated intro, live throughout the episode) and features cat behaviourist Nicky Trevorrow (live). Each episode is illustrated with animations of cats and excerpts from Simon's Cat episodes as well as Behind the Scenes footage.

Simon's Cat – Sketches
Simon Tofield released a new series titled Simon's Cat – Sketches. Unlike its main shorts series, these episodes are faster to make, giving it a looser look and feel, while keeping the humour and relatable comedy intact. This series features fresh gags, adventurous characters and new locations.

Awards

Also, Simon's Cat: Pop Time, a video game for iOS, Android and Amazon Kindle, was nominated for "Best Casual Game" and "Best Puzzle Game" at The Independent Game Developers' Association Awards 2018; another game for iOS and Android, Simon's Cat Dash, was nominated for the "Heritage" award.

Bibliography
All books authored by Simon Tofield.

 Simon's Cat (2009) 
 Simon's Cat: Beyond the Fence (2010) 
 Simon's Cat in Kitten Chaos (2011) 
 Simon's Cat: Feed Me! (2012) 
 Simon's Cat vs. The World! (2012) 
 Simon's Cat: Wake Up! (2013) 
 Simon's Cat: Play Time! (2013) 
 The Bumper Book of Simon's Cat (2013) 
 Off to the Vet... and Other Cat-astrophes (2015) 
 Simon's Cat: It's A Dog's Life (2019)

References

External links
 
 

Mass media franchises introduced in 2008
British animated films
Endemol Shine Group franchises
Fictional cats
Internet memes introduced in 2008
2008 animated films
2008 films
Canongate Books books
2000s YouTube series
2010s YouTube series
2020s YouTube series
2000s British films